New America or The New America may refer to:

Literature
 New America (short story collection), a 1982 book by Poul Anderson
 The New America: The New World, a 1935 book by H. G. Wells
 New America, the name for Newfoundland in Jules Verne's 1864 novel The Adventures of Captain Hatteras

Music
 The New America, an album by Bad Religion, 2000
 "New America", a song by Darker My Love from Alive as You Are, 2010
 "New America", a song by Digby from What's Not Plastic?, 2007
 "New America", a song by Marina from Ancient Dreams in a Modern Land, 2021

Other uses
 New America (newspaper), an official publication of the Socialist Party of America and later Social Democrats, USA 1960–1985
 New America (organization), a think tank in Washington, D.C.
 New America Media, a multimedia ethnic news agency 1996–2017

See also
 New American (disambiguation)